Crabtree Hall may refer to:

 Crabtree Hall (University of Massachusetts Amherst)
 Crabtree Hall (University of Pittsburgh)
 Crabtree Hall (University of Wisconsin–River Falls)
 Crabtree Hall, a business centre in Northallerton, UK